Arkport is a village in Steuben County, New York, United States. The population was 844 at the 2010 census. The name comes from the barges used to ship products through the village. The postal code is 14807.

The Village of Arkport is in the Town of Hornellsville and is north of the City of Hornell.

Hornell Municipal Airport (HTF) is immediately south of the village.

History 
Arkport was founded in 1797 by Christopher Hurlbut.  The Canisteo River was used to ship crops, livestock, and timber to Baltimore using arks.  The navigable portion of the river ended in Arkport; thus the name of ark-port. This practice of using arks as cargo vessels continued until 1825, when the Erie Canal was built and it became more cost-effective to ship crops via the canal. The existing Post Office was built in 1890.

Geography
Arkport is located at  (42.393347, -77.696134).

The village is on the eastern bank of the Canisteo River.

New York State Route 36 passes from north to south through the village.  The Southern Tier Expressway lies between the village and Hornell.  County Roads 48 and 67 lead into the village.

Demographics

At the 2000 census there were 832 people, 348 households, and 231 families in the village. The population density was 1,209.6 people per square mile (465.6/km). There were 364 housing units at an average density of 529.2 per square mile (203.7/km).  The racial makeup of the village was 98.44% White, 0.60% African American, 0.12% Native American, 0.36% Asian, and 0.48% from two or more races. Hispanic or Latino of any race were 0.72%.

Of the 348 households 29.3% had children under the age of 18 living with them, 51.1% were married couples living together, 11.8% had a female householder with no husband present, and 33.6% were non-families. 29.9% of households were one person and 15.2% were one person aged 65 or older. The average household size was 2.39 and the average family size was 2.98.

The age distribution was 25.7% under the age of 18, 5.4% from 18 to 24, 23.2% from 25 to 44, 23.8% from 45 to 64, and 21.9% 65 or older. The median age was 42 years. For every 100 females, there were 80.1 males. For every 100 females age 18 and over, there were 76.1 males.

The median household income was $36,250 and the median family income  was $48,684. Males had a median income of $36,136 versus $21,806 for females. The per capita income for the village was $16,170. About 1.4% of families and 5.0% of the population were below the poverty line, including 2.7% of those under age 18 and 3.2% of those age 65 or over.

References

External links
  Brief information about Arkport

Villages in New York (state)
Populated places established in 1797
Villages in Steuben County, New York
1797 establishments in New York (state)